Mysterium is an album of contemporary classical music by New York avant-garde composer John Zorn.

Reception
The Allmusic review by Stewart Mason awarded the album 3½ stars calling it "A mature and often excellent collection from a man still too often thought of as merely a free jazz noisemaker, Mysterium is well worth the time it requires".

Track listing 
All compositions by John Zorn.
 "Orphée" - 9:14
 "Frammenti del Sappho" - 13:37
 "Walpurgisnacht: Part 1" - 2:52
 "Walpurgisnacht: Part 2" - 5:11
 "Walpurgisnacht: Part 3" - 1:53

Personnel 
 Tara O'Connor – flute
 Lois Martin – viola
 June Han – harp
 Ikue Mori – electronics
 Lisa Bielawa – voice
 Martha Cluver – voice
 Abby Fischer – voice
 Kirsten Sollek – voice
 Martha Sullivan – voice 
 Jennifer Choi – violin
 Fred Sherry – cello
 Stephen Gosling – celeste, harpsichord
 Richard O'Neill – viola
 David Shively – percussion
 Brad Lubman – conductor

References 

2005 albums
Albums produced by John Zorn
John Zorn albums
Tzadik Records albums